The Midlands Hurricanes are a semi-professional rugby league club based in Birmingham, West Midlands, England. They were founded in 2021 and took over the professional franchise owned by Coventry Bears previously entering the third tier of the British rugby league system, currently known as League 1 in 2015.

History

1998–2014: Coventry Bears Formation and Amateur years
Coventry Bears was formed in 1998 by a group of university students led by Alan Robinson. They made an approach to Keith Fairbrother, the Coventry rugby union club's Chairman and one time rugby league player at Leigh, with a plan to form a team to play from Coundon Road Stadium.

The club played a season of friendly games in 1999 and were then admitted into the Rugby League Conference for the 2000 season and were unbeaten by any club within their division. They then won their quarter-final against Manchester Knights before being narrowly defeated by only one point by Rotherham Giants in the semi-finals at Super League club Warrington Wolves’ Wilderspool Stadium. Further success followed in 2001 with the Bears reaching the Grand Final at Webb Ellis Road, Rugby, only to lose out by 2pts 10-12 in a match against Teesside Steelers. The following season Coventry won the Rugby League Conference Grand Final in September 2002 when they beat Hemel Stags at Cheltenham 21-14. Following on from this success the club applied for, and won, elevation to the newly formed National League Three.

The Bears reached the National League Three Grand Final in 2004, winning comfortably versus Warrington Woolston Rovers 48-24. This score being the highest margin in a final in this Competition. The following season Coventry Bears RLFC experienced difficulties and chose to resign from the National League to take time to rebuild and regroup and set up a community junior section. 2006 saw the return of the Bears as a Rugby League Conference Midlands Premier side, and the club finished the season in second place. They went on to beat Leicester Phoenix in the qualifying semi-final to set up a Midlands Grand Final with Nottingham Outlaws, which ended in defeat 

Coventry defeated Nottingham Outlaws in 2007 to win the Midlands Premier and also won the Kilkenny 9s, The Bears went on to finish as runners-up to St Albans Centurions losing 28–20 in the final of the Harry Jepson Trophy. In 2008, the Bears finished as runners up in the Midlands Premier to Nottingham. In 2010, Coventry linked up with Super League side Wigan Warriors.

2015–2021: League 1
The Bears were accepted into the semi-professional ranks of League 1 for the 2015 season, and entered their newly formed reserve side into the Conference League South in the same season. They finished their first semi-professional season in 12th place. Coventry finished their final season as the Bears in the 2021 League 1 season in 8th place.

2022: Midlands Hurricanes
On 3 November 2021 the club announced a major rebranding in an effort to attract a wider support base from the English midlands region. The club was to be known as the Midlands Hurricanes for the 2022 RFL League 1 season.  As part of the re-branding the club relocated from Butts Park Arena to the Portway Stadium - home of rugby union team Birmingham & Solihull Bees for the 2022 season. Alan Robinson who founded the new Hurricanes club and business resigned from the Midlands Hurricanes during the 2022 season selling his stake in the professional franchise competing in League One and new business that was created and is no longer part of the new Midlands Hurricanes club in any capacity. Coventry Bears and Bears in the Community CIC Rugby League Foundation moved back to the City of Coventry and still continue to develop the clubs history and legacy there. The new Midlands Hurricanes club has since moved to the Alexander Stadium in Perry Barr for the 2023 season and is a new company under new ownership.

In May 2022 coach, Richard Squires, was banned from the sport for three months (with one month suspended) by the Rugby Football League (RFL) for breaching RFL rules on betting.  In his absence, assistant coach, Dave Scott took charge of the team.

Stadiums

1998–2004: Coundon Road

The Bears moved into Coundon Road shortly after their formation in 1998. The ground had been owned and operated by sister rugby union club Coventry R.F.C. They stayed there for six years until the ground was sold and demolished in 2004. Both clubs moved out to the newly built Butts Park Arena at the other side of Coventry.

2004–2021: Butts Park Arena

The stadium was built in 2004 and currently has one stand, the East Stand, which has a capacity of 3,000 and includes a number of conference and banqueting facilities. The West Stand which was a temporary structure holding 1,000 was removed at the end of the 2005–06 season on grounds of health and safety.

2021 squad

2022 transfers

Gains

Losses

Seasons

Honours
League
National League Three:
Winners (1): 2004
 RFL Midlands Division One:
Winners (1): 2013
RLC Midlands Premier:
Winners (3): 2007, 2009, 2010
RLC Midlands Division:
Winners (2): 2001, 2002
 RLC Western Division:
Winners (1): 2000

Cups
 Harry Jepson Trophy:
Winners (1): 2002
Grand Finalists (4): 2001, 2007, 2009, 2010

Nines
 Midlands 9s:
Winners (1): 2007, 2009, 2013
 Kilkenny 9s
Winners (1): 2007

Women
 RLC Women's Plate:
Winners (1): 2010
 RLC Women's South Division:
Winners (1): 2011

Notes

References

External links
Official website

Rugby league teams in the West Midlands (county)
Sport in Coventry
Rugby clubs established in 1998
English rugby league teams